Deeper Than Rap is the third studio album by American rapper Rick Ross. It was released on April 21, 2009, by his record label Maybach Music Group and Slip-n-Slide Records; distributed by Def Jam Recordings. Recording sessions for the album took place during 2008 to 2009, while the additional productions was handled by The Inkredibles, The Runners, DJ Toomp and Drumma Boy; as well as guest appearances from Nas, Avery Storm, Foxy Brown and Ne-Yo, among others. During the album's development, some controversy arose over the releasing of photos, showing Ross working as a correctional officer during his ongoing feud with a fellow rapper 50 Cent.

It was supported by three singles: "Magnificent" featuring John Legend, "Maybach Music 2" featuring Kanye West, Lil Wayne and T-Pain, and "All I Really Want" featuring The-Dream; alongside the promotional single "Mafia Music".

Deeper Than Rap received generally positive reviews from music critics. The album debuted at number one on the Billboard 200, selling 158,000 copies its first week in the United States. As of August 2010, the album has sold 439,000 copies in the United States.

Background 
In May 2008, Rick Ross announced his plans to begin recording his third album, titled Deeper Than Rap. In addition to this album, Ross also has been working through his several mixtapes, freestyle tracks, and his upcoming collaboration with a fellow rapper Birdman, titled The H. In July 2008, during the album's development, the controversy arose over some photographs leaked of Ross (real name William Roberts), which was taken during his career as a correctional officer.

Ross released the street track, titled "Kiss My Pinky Ring Curly", which was intended to attack towards a fellow rapper 50 Cent. Ross then mentioned a possible release date of March 24, 2009. In March 2009, the album release date was delayed to April 21, before Ross told MTV News about a possible charity concert for the underprivileged neighborhoods of New York City.

The listening party for this album was held at the Tribeca Grand Hotel in New York City on March 17. Prior to the release day, Ross had asserted in interviews with MTV that this album would be his best during his career. Rick Ross claims that if Get Rich or Die Tryin' (2003) by 50 Cent has sold 10 million copies, then his next record (Deeper Than Rap) would sell 12 million. However, this did not materialize. According to Ross, a feud with 50 Cent started, after he released the track "Mafia Music", which was released online. The album presented personal information about 50 Cent's relationship with the mother of his child.

Critical reception 

Upon its release, Deeper Than Rap received generally positive reviews from most music critics. At Metacritic, which assigns a normalized rating out of 100 to reviews from mainstream critics, the album received an average score of 73, based on 11 reviews, which indicates "generally favorable reviews". AllMusic's David Jeffries commended Ross for his "ability to steamroll over all of his shortcomings," calling it "the superstar, gangster weekend album done right." Adam M. Levin of RapReviews described the album as "essentially a gangster movie on wax, and Ross is excellent in his role as the boss at the top of the heap with nothing to lose but his cool." Jon Caramanica of The New York Times gave Deeper Than Rap a favorable review and perceived it as an improvement over Ross's previous work. On its production and musical style, Caramanica wrote "this album is lush, erotic, entitled, a stunning leisure-class document of easy wealth and carefree sex. It’s a throwback to a time of sonic and attitudinal ambition in hip-hop — the Bad Boy era of the mid- to late ’90s, with its warm soul samples connoting the new hip-hop luxury comes to mind. Few rap albums have sounded this assured, this sumptuous, in years".

Wilson McBee of Slant Magazine gave credit to Ross for showing more lyrical depth in his lyrics but found the R&B midpoint in the album to lead Ross "closer to being Flo Rida's fat uncle than Jay-Z's second in command." He concluded that, "Phony or not, Ross has planted himself near the center of hip-hop's orbit, and Deeper proves that it's going to take more than YouTube beefs and blogger scandal-mongering to move him out of the way." Steve Jones of USA Today felt that even with the beats, imposing charisma and huge guest list, Ross didn't deviate far enough from the typical rap themes he told before in previous efforts, saying that "His tales of gangster riches are colorful, but you wish Ross would find something deeper to talk about." Christian Hoard of Rolling Stone felt that Ross' formula of shiny beats that supply tracks telling rap lifestyle stories was tiring, saying that "over the length of a full album it all feels a bit too familiar."

Commercial performance 
In the United States, Deeper Than Rap debuted at number one on the US Billboard 200, selling 158,000 copies during its first week, becoming Ross's third album to debut at number one. In its second week, the album dropped to number four on the chart, selling 51,125 copies. In its third week, the album dropped to number eight on the chart, selling 34,828 copies that week. In its fourth week, the album moved down to number nine on the chart, selling 26,487 copies, bring its four-week total to 270,000 copies. After seven weeks, the album had sold 315,385 copies in the US. As of August 2010, the album sold 439,000 copies in the United States.

Track listing 

Sample credits
 "Maybach Music 2" contains a sample of "Time Is the Teacher" performed by Dexter Wansel.
 "Magnificent" contains a sample of "Gotta Make It Up to You" performed by Angela Bofill.
 "Yacht Club" contains a sample of "El Jardia" performed by Johnny Pate.
 "Usual Suspects" contains a sample of "Garden of Peace" performed by Lonnie Liston Smith and "Dead Presidents II" performed by Jay-Z.
 "Rich Off Cocaine" contains a sample of "Color Her Sunshine" performed by Willie Hutch.
 "Valley of Death" contains a sample of "I'm So Blue and You Are Too" performed by Barry White.
 "Cigar Music" contains a sample of "Don't Ask My Neighbor" performed by Ahmad Jamal, written by Frederick Jones, Danny Leake, Richard Evans and Morris Jenkins,.

Personnel 

Rick Ross – vocals
Musa "Milk" Adeoye – A&R
David L. Anderson II – keyboards
J.D. Anderson – drums
Chris Athens – mastering
Alexander Bethune – A&R
Adam Beyrer – engineer
Leslie Brathwaite – mixing
Robin Thicke – vocals
Foxy Brown – vocals
Josh "Redd" Burke – A&R
Kevin Cates – producer
Marcus Coleman – programming
Kevin Cossom – vocals (background), producer
Ben Diehl – engineer
Anthony Gallo – engineer
Tom Gardner – assistant engineer
Latonya "Tone Trezure" Givens – writer, singer
Javon Greene – A&R
Jay Jones – bass
Terese Joseph – A&R
Justice League – producer

David Karmiol – guitar, talk box
K.C. – vocals
Kali Khaled – executive producer, A&R
Giancarlo Lino – mixing assistant
Ted Lucas – executive producer
Magazeen – vocals
Jonathan Mannion – photography
Deborah Mannis-Gardner – sample clearance
The Monarch – producer
Dave Pensado – mixing
Lasim Richards – trombone
Rashawn Ross – trumpet
Rick Ross – executive producer
The Runners – producer
TaVon Sampson – art direction, design
Ray Seay – mixing
Derrick Selby – engineer
Chris "Tricky" Stewart – producer
Shakir Stewart – executive producer
Jeff "Supa Jeff" Villanueva – engineer, digital editing
Kris Yiengst – art coordinator, photo coordination

Charts

Weekly charts

Year-end charts

See also 
 List of Billboard 200 number-one albums of 2009

References

External links 
 
 Deeper Than Rap at Discogs

2009 albums
Rick Ross albums
Maybach Music Group albums
Def Jam Recordings albums
Albums produced by DJ Toomp
Albums produced by Drumma Boy
Albums produced by J.U.S.T.I.C.E. League
Albums produced by Tricky Stewart
Albums produced by the Runners
Albums produced by Bink (record producer)
Albums produced by the Inkredibles